Thomas Blanchard Wilson Jr. (March 25, 1931 – September 6, 1978) was an American record producer best known for his work in the 1960s with Bob Dylan, the Mothers of Invention, Simon & Garfunkel, the Velvet Underground, Cecil Taylor, Sun Ra, Eddie Harris, Nico, Eric Burdon and the Animals, the Blues Project, the Clancy Brothers and Tommy Makem, and others.

Early life and education
Wilson was born in Waco, Texas on March 25, 1931, to parents Thomas and Fannie Wilson (née Brown). He attended A.J. Moore High School in Waco and was a member of New Hope Baptist Church.  Wilson attended Fisk University before transferring to Harvard University, where he became involved in the Harvard New Jazz Society, radio station WHRB, and was president of the Young Republicans. He graduated cum laude from Harvard in 1954.

Career
After university, Wilson borrowed $500 to set up Transition Records, having a goal in mind of setting up a record label and recording the most advanced jazz musicians of the day. The label released about a dozen albums, including Sun Ra's Jazz By Sun Ra (retitled Sun Song when reissued in 1968), which was Ra's first LP (a second LP of Transition material remained unreleased until 1968), and the album Jazz Advance by Cecil Taylor, which was Taylor's debut release. Transition also released the first sessions led by Doug Watkins, Donald Byrd, and Herb Pomeroy. The label went bankrupt in 1957 and the catalog was sold off to the Blue Note and Delmark Records. Wilson's work with Transition Records helped him obtain a job with United Artists Records in 1957. He worked as a producer for jazz labels, including Savoy Records, for whom he again recorded Sun Ra in 1961.

Columbia Records
As a staff producer at Columbia Records, Wilson was one of the "midwives" of folk-rock, producing three of Bob Dylan's key 1960s albums: The Times They Are a-Changin', Another Side of Bob Dylan, and Bringing It All Back Home, along with the 1965 single, "Like a Rolling Stone." Wilson also produced the final four tracks Dylan recorded for The Freewheelin' Bob Dylan, after he replaced John Hammond as Dylan's producer in 1963.

Wilson produced Simon & Garfunkel's 1964 debut LP Wednesday Morning, 3 A.M. which included "The Sound of Silence". Seizing on local radio interest in the song in Florida and inspired by the huge success of the Byrds' folk-rock version of Dylan's "Mr Tambourine Man", Wilson took the duo's original acoustic track and, without Simon's or Garfunkel's knowledge, overdubbed electric instruments, turning the track into a #1 pop hit, helping to launch the folk-rock genre. Simon and Garfunkel, who had already split, reunited after the hit and went on to greater success.

After working with Wilson, both Dylan and Simon & Garfunkel worked with another Columbia staff producer, Bob Johnston, who produced several albums for both acts.

Verve/MGM Records
In 1966, Wilson signed the Mothers of Invention to Verve Records and was credited as producer on the group's debut album Freak Out!.

Also in 1966, after the Animals split from producer Mickie Most, Wilson became their producer, which continued until the original band broke up in 1967. Wilson also produced the Velvet Underground, featuring Lou Reed and John Cale. Although Andy Warhol is credited as the producer of the group's debut album, The Velvet Underground & Nico, Cale credits Wilson as the true producer, as Warhol was mostly absent from the sessions. Another of Wilson's Verve production credits was the Blues Project's first studio album Projections (1966) featuring Al Kooper (with whom Wilson had previously worked on Dylan's "Like a Rolling Stone") as vocalist and keyboard player. Wilson co-produced the Soft Machine's eponymous first album with Chas Chandler in 1968.

Achievements

Wilson was an important producer (alongside his contemporaries Phil Spector, George Martin, Jimmy Miller, Brian Wilson, Quincy Jones, Tom Dowd, and Teo Macero) of the 1960s. He has been said to have had the skill of "putting the right people together for the right projects".

Wilson made an important contribution to Dylan's  rock and roll sound, producing his first rock recordings on Bringing It All Back Home. In the 1969 Rolling Stone Interview, Jann Wenner asked, "There's been some articles on Wilson and he says that he's the one that gave you the rock and roll sound. Is that true?" Dylan: "Did he say that? Well if he said it... [laughs] more power to him. [laughs] He did to a certain extent. That is true. He did. He had a sound in mind".

Frank Zappa paid this tribute: "Tom Wilson was a great guy. He had vision, you know? And he really stood by us ... I remember the first thing that we recorded was 'Any Way the Wind Blows,' and that was okay. Then we did 'Who Are the Brain Police?' and I saw him through the glass and he was on the phone immediately to New York going, 'I don't know!' Trying to break it to 'em easy, I guess."
"Wilson was sticking his neck out. He laid his job on the line by producing the album."

Death
Wilson died of a heart attack, a complication of Marfan syndrome, in Los Angeles in 1978, aged 47. He was buried at the Doris Miller Memorial Park in McLennan County, Texas.

Selected discography
1956: Sun Ra: Sun Song
1956: Cecil Taylor: Jazz Advance
1956: Donald Byrd: Byrd’s Eye View
1958: Louis Smith: Here Comes Louis Smith
1959: Curtis Fuller: Sliding Easy
1959: Cecil Taylor: Love for Sale
1959: Art Farmer: Brass Shout
1961: Sun Ra: The Futuristic Sounds of Sun Ra
1963: Bob Dylan: The Freewheelin' Bob Dylan (4 tracks, uncredited)
1964: Bob Dylan: The Times They Are a-Changin'
1964: Bob Dylan: Another Side of Bob Dylan
1964: The Clancy Brothers and Tommy Makem: The First Hurrah!
1964: Simon and Garfunkel: Wednesday Morning, 3 A.M.
1965: The Clancy Brothers and Tommy Makem: Recorded Live in Ireland
1965: Simon and Garfunkel: "The Sound of Silence" single (also on the 1965 album)
1965: Bob Dylan: Bringing It All Back Home
1965: Bob Dylan: "Like a Rolling Stone" single (also on the 1965 album Highway 61 Revisited, otherwise produced by Bob Johnston)
1966: The Mothers of Invention: Freak Out!
1966: The Animals: Animalisms (UK) / Animalization (US)
1966: Eric Burdon & the Animals: Eric Is Here
1966: The Blues Project: Projections
1967: The Mothers of Invention: Absolutely Free
1967: Eric Burdon & the New Animals: Winds of Change
1967: The Velvet Underground: The Velvet Underground & Nico (as post-production editor, remixer, and producer of the track "Sunday Morning")
1967: Nico: Chelsea Girl
1968: The Velvet Underground: White Light/White Heat
1968: The Mothers of Invention: We're Only In It For The Money (credited as executive producer)
1968: Eric Burdon & the Animals: The Twain Shall Meet
1968: Soft Machine: The Soft Machine (co-producer)
1968: Harumi: Harumi
1968: The Fraternity of Man: The Fraternity of Man
1969: The Fraternity of Man: Get It On!

References

External links 
 Tom Wilson (American record producer) – Britannica Online Encyclopedia
 The Amazing Tom Wilson – Blogcritics Music
 Tom Wilson, Producer, biographical website

1931 births
1978 deaths
Record producers from Texas
Fisk University alumni
People from Waco, Texas
Harvard University alumni
American music industry executives
African-American record producers
20th-century African-American people